Camp Creek is a stream in Montgomery, Warren and Lincoln counties  in Missouri. It is a tributary of the West Fork of the Cuivre River.

The stream passes through the northwest corner of Warren County between those points.

Camp Creek was named for the fact pioneers camped near its course.

See also
List of rivers of Missouri

References

Rivers of Lincoln County, Missouri
Rivers of Montgomery County, Missouri
Rivers of Warren County, Missouri
Rivers of Missouri